Wendelin Morgenthaler (October 18, 1888 – April 22, 1963) was a German politician of the Christian Democratic Union (CDU) and  member of the German Bundestag from 1949 to 1957.

Life 
After 1945 Morgenthaler joined the CDU. He was a member of the district council of the district of Bühl. He was a member of the German Bundestag from its first election in 1949 to 1957. He represented the Rastatt constituency in parliament as a directly elected member.

Literature

References

1888 births
1963 deaths
Members of the Bundestag for Baden-Württemberg
Members of the Bundestag 1953–1957
Members of the Bundestag 1949–1953
Members of the Bundestag for the Christian Democratic Union of Germany